Ankst was a Welsh independent record label formed in 1988 at the University of Wales, Aberystwyth by Alun Llwyd, Gruffudd Jones and Emyr Glyn Williams. After a handful of low key cassette releases, the label relocated to Cardiff and became a more serious concern, providing a launch-pad for several popular Welsh artists, including Llwybr Llaethog, Super Furry Animals and Gorky's Zygotic Mynci. The Rough Guide to Wales described Ankst as "one of the most prolific, eclectic and innovative" of the 1990s Welsh music labels.

Between 1988 and 1997, the label put out some 80 releases before splitting in 1997 into two separate companies. Ankst Management (run by Llwyd and Jones and responsible for Melys, Super Furry Animals, Gorky's Zygotic Mynci, Los Campesinos!, The Longcut, and, for a time, Cerys Matthews) and Ankstmusik, the label (which is now based in Pentraeth on Anglesey and run by Williams), featuring such bands as Tystion, Ectogram, Zabrinski, Rheinallt H Rowlands, MC Mabon and Wendykurk.

Ankst moved into film making in the 2000s, releasing the Bafta-winning Y Lleill in 2005.

Alun Llwyd also co-manages, with Kevin Tame, the Cardiff-based indie label Turnstile, home of Perfume Genius, Christopher Owens, Gruff Rhys, Cate Le Bon and others.

See also 
 Lists of record labels

References

External links
 Official site

British independent record labels
Record labels established in 1988
Welsh record producers
Welsh-language music